Joyful may refer to:

A feeling of joy
Joyful (Ayo album), a 2006 album by Ayo
Joyful, a 1969 album by Orpheus
Joyful, a 2019 song by X Ambassadors
"Joyful" (song), a 2021 song by Dante Bowe

See also
Joyfull, California, former settlement near Bakersfield, California